Thomas or Tom Corbett may refer to:
Tom Corbett (born 1949), American politician
Tom Corbett, Space Cadet, the main character in a series of Tom Corbett — Space Cadet stories
Thomas Corbett (Shaker doctor) (1780–1857)
Thomas Corbett (Indian Army officer) (1888–1981), British Indian Army officer
Thomas Corbett, 2nd Baron Rowallan (1895–1977), Chief Scout of the British Commonwealth and Empire and Governor of Tasmania
Thomas Lorimer Corbett (1854–1910), British Conservative politician
Thomas Corbett (Lincolnshire MP), English member of parliament
Thomas Corbett (secretary of the Admiralty), British Treasury official and politician
Thomas P. Corbett (1914–1995), American politician and jurist
Tom Corbett, character in Above Us the Waves
Boston Corbett (Thomas P. Corbett, 1832–1894), Union Army soldier who shot and killed John Wilkes Booth